The Monmouth class was a ten-ship class of 10,000-ton armoured cruisers built around 1901 to 1903 for the Royal Navy and designed specifically for commerce protection. The ships were also referred to as County class cruisers as they carried the names of British counties.

Design 

Expected only to fight light cruisers and armed merchant ships, the class was armed with fourteen 6-inch guns at a time when most British armoured cruisers also carried at least a pair of 9.2-inch guns: Four of the guns were mounted in two twin turrets at a good height, the remaining ten were installed in hull-mounted casemates, five on each side. The lower casemate guns were just a few feet above water, making them impossible to use in heavy seas.  Sir John Fisher commented that "Sir William White designed the County class but forgot the guns." On the other hand, they were relatively fast ships for their time.

Ships 
The following table gives the build details and purchase cost of the members of the Monmouth class.  Standard British practice at that time was for these costs to exclude armament and stores.  The compilers of The Naval Annual revised costs quoted for British ships between the 1905 and 1906 editions.  The reasons for the differences are unclear.

Service 

Upon completion, the ships served briefly in home waters before being assigned to various oversea stations (the China Station and the North America and West Indies Station). During this time HMS Bedford was wrecked in the East China Sea and scrapped.

Following the outbreak of WW1, the ships were primarily tasked with combating German commerce raiders, patrolling in both the North and South Atlantic. HMS Monmouth was assigned to Rear Admiral Sir Christopher Cradock's squadron, and was sunk at the Battle of Coronel. HMS Kent was also assigned to Cradock's squadron, but failed to join in time; she remained at the Falklands and joined Admiral Sturdee's squadron, which also included HMS Cornwall. In the ensuing Battle of the Falklands, HMS Kent pursued and sank , while HMS Cornwall pursued and sank .

After the war, several of the ships served briefly as training ships.  All were withdrawn from service and scrapped in 1920–21.

Notes

Footnotes

Bibliography 
 Brassey, T.A. (ed) The Naval Annual 1905
 

 
 Leyland, J. and Brassey, T.A. (ed) The Naval Annual 1906

External links 

The Dreadnought Project Technical details of the ships.

Cruiser classes
 
Ship classes of the Royal Navy

de:HMS Monmouth (1901)#Die Schiffe der Monmouth- oder County-Klasse